MV Freedom Star is a formerly NASA-owned and United Space Alliance-operated vessel which primarily served as an SRB recovery ship following the launch of Space Shuttle missions. It also performed tugboat duties and acted as a research platform.

From 2012 to 2016, it was a National Defense Reserve Fleet vessel in the James River Reserve Fleet, when it was then loaned by the U.S. Maritime Administration (MARAD) to the Paul Hall Center for Maritime Training and Education in Piney Point, Maryland, for use as a training vessel.

History 
The recovery ships were built at Atlantic Marine Shipyard on Fort George Island, Florida, and delivered in January 1981 to their original owner, United Technologies Corporation. As well as recovering the Space Shuttle's SRBs, Freedom Star has since 1998 been used to tow  the Space Shuttle external fuel tanks from their assembly plant at Michoud Assembly Facility near New Orleans, Louisiana, to the Vehicle Assembly Building at the Kennedy Space Center in Florida.  She served a similar role in recovering the first test flight of the Ares I and was anticipated to continue recovering boosters for the Constellation program before it was canceled in 2010.

Freedom Star underwent special strengthening enhancements to withstand the greater burden of towing the external fuel tanks. The stern was strengthened at critical points, new bulwark fairings were added, and an H-bitt was installed through which cabling is threaded to keep it centered during towing operations. Also installed was a hydraulic towing winch, referred to as a double-drum waterfall winch, holding  or more of wire rope on each drum. One drum supports booster retrievals while the other is devoted to external tank towing.

Freedom Star had been used to support scientific research operations including research for the National Oceanic and Atmospheric Administration and several universities.  She was usually docked alongside her sister at the Solid Rocket Booster processing facility at the Cape Canaveral Space Force Station in Florida.

Each ship is propelled by two main engines providing a total of 2,900 horsepower. The main engines turn two seven-foot (2.1-meter) propellers with controllable pitch, which provides greater response time and maneuverability. The ships also are equipped with two thrusters. The stern thruster is a water jet system that allows the ship to move in any direction without the use of propellers. This system was installed to protect the endangered manatee population that inhabits regions of the Banana River where the ships are based. The system also allows divers to work near the ship during operations at a greatly reduced risk.

In April 2012, NASA used Freedom Star to track a commercial orbital spaceflight by a Falcon 9 launch vehicle flown to the International Space Station by their space transport contractor SpaceX.

Transfer 
On September 28, 2012, Freedom Star was transferred to the U.S. Department of Transportation's James River Reserve Fleet for potential use as a training vessel.

On November 6, 2015, USNS Freedom Star arrived at the Piney Point, Maryland-based maritime training school to become the Paul Hall Center's training vessel, on loan from MARAD's James River Reserve Fleet in Jamestown, Virginia. At the school, the Freedom Star replaces the Osprey, a yard patrol type vessel that served as the school's training platform from 1996 to 2009.

References

External links 

 Space Shuttle Solid Rocket Booster Retrieval Ships at NASA.gov

Maritime vessels related to spaceflight
Merchant ships of the United States
NASA vehicles
Space Shuttle program
1981 ships
Training ships of the United States